Joe Rice (born March 6, 1996) is an American professional soccer player who plays as a goalkeeper for Hartford Athletic in the USL Championship.

Career
Rice played college soccer at Virginia Commonwealth University between 2014 and 2018, where he spent a year redshirted and only made six appearances for the Rams.

While at college, Rice appeared in the National Premier Soccer League with Chesterfield United and Virginia Beach City, as well as with USL PDL side Lionsbridge FC.

On March 20, 2019, Rice signed a professional contract with USL League One side Richmond Kickers.

On March 3, 2020, Rice joined New England Revolution II ahead of the 2020 season.

Rice was not announced as a returning player for the club's 2022 season where they'd be competing in the newly formed MLS Next Pro.

On February 11, 2022, it was announced Rice has joined USL Championship side Loudoun United.

On September 9, 2022, Rice joined Detroit City on a loan for the remainder of the 2022 season.

Rice signed with Hartford Athletic on January 24, 2023.

References

External links 
 

1996 births
Living people
Sportspeople from Fairfax, Virginia
Soccer players from Virginia
American soccer players
Association football goalkeepers
VCU Rams men's soccer players
Virginia Beach City FC players
Lionsbridge FC players
Richmond Kickers players
New England Revolution II players
Loudoun United FC players
Detroit City FC players
Hartford Athletic players
National Premier Soccer League players
USL League Two players
USL League One players
USL Championship players